Mária Gáliková (born 21 August 1980) is a racewalker from Slovakia.

She competed in the Women's 20 kilometres walk event at the 2015 World Championships in Athletics in Beijing, China, and the 2016 Summer Olympics.

See also
 Slovakia at the 2015 World Championships in Athletics

References

External links
 
 Mária Gáliková at the Slovenský Olympijský Výbor 
 
 http://www.all-athletics.com/node/147814
 http://www.european-athletics.org/athletes/group=g/athlete=132898-galikova-maria/index.html
 http://dev.espn.co.uk/olympics/summer/2016/athletes/_/athlete/60812

1980 births
Living people
Slovak female racewalkers
Place of birth missing (living people)
World Athletics Championships athletes for Slovakia
Athletes (track and field) at the 2016 Summer Olympics
Olympic athletes of Slovakia